Nathan Kahane is an American film producer known for being the co-founder of Mandate Pictures and Good Universe with Joe Drake. 

Kahane's production credits include Last Vegas (2013); Neighbors (2014); The House, a 2017 comedy starring Will Ferrell and Amy Poehler, for New Line Cinema; and the sci-fi thriller Extinction (2018), written by Spenser Cohen.

Kahane is a partner with Ghost House Pictures. Kahane was an executive producer on Ghost House Pictures' The Grudge (2004), Evil Dead (2013), and Don't Breathe (2016).

Career 

Kahane's entertainment career began in the International Creative Management agent training program.

Before partnering with Drake, Kahane was the executive vice president of The Canton Company, Mark Canton's production company housed at Warner Bros. While at The Canton Company, Kahane was a co-producer on the thriller film Trapped (2002). He was also executive in charge of production for Angel Eyes (2001) and Get Carter (2000) and packaged titles such as Alexander (2004) and Troy (2004).

In 2002, Kahane became an executive vice president of motion pictures at Senator International, German company Senator Entertainment AG's Los Angeles-based production and distribution operation.

In 2003, Kahane co-founded Mandate Pictures with Drake. He was also the president of Mandate Pictures. At Mandate Pictures, he produced films such as the Harold & Kumar franchise, Juno (2007), the comedy 50/50 (2011), Young Adult (2011), Hope Springs (2012), and This Is the End (2013).

In 2012, Kahane co-founded Good Universe with Drake.

In 2018, Kahane became president of the Lionsgate motion picture group.

Personal life 
Kahane is an alumnus of the Haas School of Business at the University of California, Berkeley.

Filmography
He was a producer in all films listed below unless otherwise noted.

Film

Production manager

Miscellaneous crew

Thanks

Television

References

External links 
 

Living people
Film producers from California
Haas School of Business alumni
Year of birth missing (living people)